Wisley Rotich is the second and current governor of Elgeyo Marakwet County, Kenya. He was elected on 9 August 2022 to succeed the outgoing governor Alex Tolgos, who had served his two terms.

References

Living people
1986 births
People from Elgeyo-Marakwet County
Local politicians in Kenya
21st-century Kenyan politicians